Cairo College of Fine Arts is a school of fine arts established in Cairo in 1908 and is now the Faculty of Fine Arts of the Helwan University.

History 

The College of Fine Arts was founded by Yusuf Kamal in 1908.  More than 150 students were enrolled in the first year.  Education was imparted free of charge to students of all nationalities and religions. It offered classes in  painting, decoration, sculpture, architecture, and calligraphy.  Guillaume Laplagne, a French sculptor established in Egypt, was the school's first director.

The college's students exhibited for the first time in 1911 at the Automobile Club in Cairo. Some consider that this can be considered the first exhibition by Egyptian artists of the century.

It was taken over by the Ministry of Education (Egypt) in 1928.

See also 

 Helwan University

References 

Art schools in Egypt
College of Fine Arts in Cairo
1908 establishments in Egypt